The 2023 Nigerian Senate elections in Adamawa State will be held on 25 February 2023, to elect the 3 federal Senators from Adamawa State, one from each of the state's three senatorial districts. The elections will coincide with the 2023 presidential election, as well as other elections to the Senate and elections to the House of Representatives; with state elections being held two weeks later. Primaries were held between 4 April and 9 June 2022.

Background
In terms of the previous Senate elections, none of the three incumbent senators were returned, with APC-turned-ADC Adamawa Central Senator Abdul-Aziz Nyako retiring to unsuccessfully run for governor whilst both APC senators (North's Binta Masi Garba and South's Ahmad Mo'allahyidi Abubakar) were defeated in their re-election bids. In the Central district, Aishatu Dahiru Ahmed regained the seat for the APC with 57% of the vote; on the other hand, the PDP's Ishaku Elisha Abbo and Binos Dauda Yaroe won with 44% in the North district and 53% in the South district. These results showed both the failure of the Adamawa ADC to hold the seats it gained through defections and the PDP's gains in the state as the party also won five House of Representatives seats and gained control of the House of Assembly. The PDP presidential nominee, Adamawa-native Atiku Abubakar, also won the state back from Buhari and Ahmadu Umaru Fintiri defeated APC incumbent Bindow Jibrilla in the gubernatorial election.

During the 2019–2023 term, the all senators gained notoriety as Ahmed was the only women serving senator from northern Nigeria until December 2020 and Yaroe became known for medical projects in his district. However, Abbo was the most high-profile senator as he was caught on video violently assaulting a shop owner and eventually had to pay damages to his victim; he was also the youngest serving senator in the entire body and became the first senator to switch parties when he defected to the APC in November 2020.

Overview

Summary

Adamawa Central 

The Adamawa Central district covers Fufore, Girei, Hong, Song, Yola North, and Yola South local government areas. The incumbent is Aishatu Dahiru Ahmed (APC), who was elected with 57.1% of the vote in 2019. In March 2022, Ahmed announced that she would run for governor of Adamawa State, instead of seeking re-election.

Primary elections

All Progressives Congress 

On the primary date, three candidates contested an indirect primary in Yola that ended with former Senator Abdul-Aziz Nyako emerging as the nominee after results showed him defeating first runner-up Abdullahi Musa by a 58% margin. In his acceptance speech, Nyako thanked delegates before vowing to bring good representation to the district.

People's Democratic Party 

On the primary date, an indirect primary in Yola resulted in the victory of Aminu Iya Abbas—the Speaker of the Adamawa State House of Assembly and MHA for Uba-Gaya. Abbas beat first runner-up Awwal Tukur, Adamawa State University Governing Council Chairman and the son of former Governor Bamanga Tukur, by a 31% margin. However, a group of losing aspirints filed a lawsuit challenging the primary based on claims of electoral irregularities; a Federal High Court judgment annulled the primary on 28 November but based the ruling on the illegal participation of Tukur, who had not resigned his appointed government position as required by law. In January 2023, Abbas appealed the ruling at the Yola Division of the Court of Appeal. The next month, the Court of Appeal reinstated Abbas as the valid nominee.

Campaign 
In race analysis in December 2022, reporting from The Nation categorized the election as extremely competitive while also noting Ahmadu Hamman (NNPP) as a prominent candidate. A piece from The Africa Report in January echoed the sentiment of competitiveness, also pointing out the power of the Nyako family in the area.

General election

Results

By federal constituency
The results of the election by federal constituency.

By local government area
The results of the election by local government area.

Adamawa North 

The Adamawa North district covers Madagali, Maiha, Michika, Mubi North, and Mubi South local government areas. The incumbent is Ishaku Elisha Abbo (APC), who was elected with 44.5% of the vote in 2019 as a member of the PDP; he defected to the APC in November 2020. In December 2020, Abbo said that he would run for governor of Adamawa State, instead of seeking re-election; however, he did not purchase gubernatorial primary forms and eventually chose to run for re-election to the Senate.

Primary elections

All Progressives Congress 

On the primary date, screened candidates contested an indirect primary that ended with Abbo's renomination. Abbo returned as nominee with results showing him defeating runner-up businessman Hamisu Idris Medugu by a 13% margin. In a Facebook post, Abbo thanked his campaign team and former opponents. However, in the wake of Abbo's expulsion from the APC in October, party members sued to have him removed as the party's senatorial nominee. A Federal High Court ruling on 10 January 2023 removed Abbo as nominee; in response, Abbo vowed to appeal the judgment.

People's Democratic Party 

Four screened candidates advanced to the primary where Amos Yohana defeated Zira Maigadi by a 56% margin.

Campaign 
In a Senate campaign analysis piece in December 2022, The Nation reporters categorized Abbo as the frontrunner due to the relatively low name recognition of his opponents but noted the crossover appeal Abdullahi Dauda Belel (NNPP) appeared to have among supporters of other parties. However, the race was drastically changed in the next month when a court ruling removed Abbo as the APC nominee due to his expulsion from the party.

General election

Results

By federal constituency
The results of the election by federal constituency.

By local government area
The results of the election by local government area.

Adamawa South 

The Adamawa South district covers Demsa, Ganye, Guyuk, Jada, Lamurde, Mayo-Belwa, Numan, Shelleng, and Toungo local government areas. The incumbent is Binos Dauda Yaroe (PDP), who was elected with 53.5% of the vote in 2019, who is seeking re-election.

Primary elections

All Progressives Congress 

On the primary date, five candidates threatened to withdraw from the primary due to alleged vote-buying by an agent of the sixth candidate—Adamu Ismaila Numan. In response, the primary committee suspended the exercise and eventually rescheduled it for 29 May. The rescheduled primary ended with victory for Ismaila Numan but the five other candidates again protested the results and called for Ismaila Numan's disqualification due to vote buying.

People's Democratic Party 

On the primary date, an indirect primary in Numan resulted in the Yaroe's renomination as he beat his sole opponent—Peter Fwa—by a 62% margin.

Campaign 
In review of the campaign in December 2022, reporting from The Nation categorized Yaroe as the frontrunner due to the relatively low name recognition of his opponents and the controversial APC primary.

General election

Results

By federal constituency
The results of the election by federal constituency.

By local government area
The results of the election by local government area.

See also 
 2023 Nigerian Senate election
 2023 Nigerian elections

Notes

References 

Adamawa State senatorial elections
2023 Adamawa State elections
Adamawa State Senate elections